Scientist Rids the World of the Evil Curse of the Vampires is an album by the dub musician Scientist. It was originally released in 1981. A digitally remastered version was released by Greensleeves Records as the 25th of their Reggae Classics series in 2001.

Album information
The album was produced and arranged by Henry "Junjo" Lawes. All tracks were recorded at Channel One and played by The Roots Radics Band, and mixed by Scientist at King Tubby's studio.

Scientist sourced his material for this album from artists Michael Prophet, Wailing Souls, Johnny Osbourne and Wayne Jarrett. Here are Scientist's mixes and their original equivalents:

Grand Theft Auto III
Several tracks from the album ("Dance of the Vampires", "The Mummy's Shroud", "The Corpse Rises", "Your Teeth In My Neck" and "Plague of Zombies") were featured in the soundtrack to the popular video game Grand Theft Auto III. They comprised the fictional radio station K-Jah and were the inspiration for many of the DJ's irreverent-sounding comments.

Despite being paid a royalty on these and all recordings he made for Henry "Junjo" Lawes, Scientist sued Greensleeves Records unsuccessfully in a US court. The court ruled that according to precedent a recording mixer was not considered the author of a musical work, and so Rockstar were correct to treat the producer Henry "Junjo" Lawes as the copyright holder of the album.

Track listing
"Voodoo Curse" – 3:48
"Dance of the Vampires" – 3:26
"Blood On His Lips" – 3:00
"Cry of the Werewolf" – 4:25
"The Mummy's Shroud" – 4:25
"The Corpse Rises" – 3:27
"Night of the Living Dead" – 4:14
"Your Teeth In My Neck" – 4:38
"Plague of Zombies" – 2:49
"Ghost of Frankenstein" – 3:24

Personnel

 Errol "Flabba" Holt – Bass guitar
 Lincoln "Style" Scott – Drums
 Carlton "Santa" Davis – Drums
 Noel "Sowell" Bailey – Rhythm Guitar
 Eric "Bingy Bunny" Lamont – Rhythm Guitar
 Gladstone "Gladdy" Anderson – Piano
 Ansel Collins – Keyboards
 Winston Wright – Organ
 Winston "Bo Peep" Bowen – Lead Guitar
 Alan Bassford – Lead Guitar
 Noel "Scully" Simms – Percussion
 Uziah "Sticky" Thompson – Percussion
 Christopher "Sky Juice" Blake – Percussion

Horns
 "Deadly" Headley Bennett – Saxophone
 Dean Fraser – Saxophone
 Ronald "Nambo" Robinson – Trombone

Technical
Henry Junjo Lawes - production, arrangements
Scientist - mixing at King Tubby's Studios
Tony McDermott - cover artwork

References

External links
Jamaica Gleaner: "Greensleeves Records wins copyright case" (May 19, 2005)

Scientist (musician) albums
1981 albums
Dub albums
Greensleeves Records albums